John O'Brien may refer to:

Public officials

American 
 John O'Brien (Ohio politician) (1932–1985), former member of the Ohio House of Representatives
 John D. O'Brien, state senator in the 1997–1998 Massachusetts legislature
 John F. O'Brien (secretary of state) (c. 1850–1927), Secretary of State of New York, 1903–1906
 John F. O'Brien (judge) (1874–1939), New York Court of Appeals judge
 John H. O'Brien, 4th Fire Commissioner of the City of New York
 John J. O'Brien (civil servant) (1919–2001), investigated the assassination of President John F. Kennedy
 John J. O'Brien (commissioner), former commissioner of the Massachusetts Probation Service
 John P. O'Brien (1873–1951), 98th mayor of New York City
 John L. O'Brien (1911–2007), American politician in the Washington House of Representatives

Irish 
John O'Brien (bishop) (died 1767), Irish Bishop of Cork and Cloyne
John O'Brien (Irish politician) (1794–1855), MP for Limerick City in the UK Parliament 1841–1852
John O'Brien (priest) (1931–2008), Irish Roman Catholic priest and musician
John Thomond O'Brien (1786–1861), Irish soldier in the Argentine War of Independence

British 
John O'Brien (British politician) (died 1982), far right figure, onetime leader of the British National Front
Sir Terence O'Brien (colonial administrator) (John Terence Nicholls O'Brien, 1830–1904), British surveyor, engineer and colonial governor

Canadian 
John O'Brien (admiral) (1918–1996), commander of the Royal Canadian Navy
John O'Brien (Canadian politician) (1847–1917), merchant and member of the Legislative Assembly of New Brunswick

New Zealand 
John O'Brien (New Zealand politician) (1925–1990), New Zealand political candidate and party leader

Australian
John O'Brien (Australian politician) (1866–1932), Member of the Queensland Legislative Assembly
John O'Brien (Australian Army officer) (1908–1980), Australian major general and Mayor of Woollahra

Sportspeople

Baseball 
John O'Brien (outfielder) (1851–1914), baseball outfielder
John O'Brien (second baseman) (1866–1913), baseball infielder
Johnny O'Brien (born 1930), 1950's baseball second baseman
Cinders O'Brien (John F. O'Brien, 1867–1892), baseball pitcher

Footballers 
John O'Brien (Dublin footballer), senior inter-county Gaelic footballer for Dublin and Round Towers, Clondalkin
John O'Brien (Louth footballer) (born 1985), Gaelic footballer for Louth
John O'Brien (soccer) (born 1977), American soccer player
Jon O'Brien (born 1961), English footballer

Other sports 
John O'Brien (basketball, born 1888) (1888–1967), American basketball referee and executive
John O'Brien (basketball, born 1916) (1916–1994), American professional basketball player in the 1940s
John O'Brien (boxer) (1937–1979), Scottish boxer of the 1960s and '70s
John O'Brien (cricketer, born 1961), English cricketer
 John O'Brien (Irish cricketer) (1866–1920), Irish cricketer
John O'Brien (hurler) (born 1982), Irish hurler
John O'Brien (rower) (1927–1995), New Zealand representative rower
John O'Brien (tennis) (born 1932), Australian tennis player and hostage in the 2014 Sydney hostage crisis
John O'Brien (water polo) (1931–2020), Australian Olympic water polo player
John Ambrose O'Brien (1885–1968), founding owner of the Montreal Canadiens ice hockey team
John O'Brien (businessman), British businessman

Other people

 John O'Brien (marine artist) (1831–1891), Canadian marine artist
 John O'Brien, the original name of stage actor John T. Raymond (1836–1887)
 John O'Brien (poet) (1878–1952), Australian priest, poet and author
 John B. O'Brien (1884–1936), American actor and director
 John O'Brien (publisher), Irish American publisher and academic
 John O'Brien (novelist) (1960–1994), American author
 John O'Brien (filmmaker) (born 1962), Vermont film director
 John O'Brien (advocate), disability inclusion advocate and writer
 John O'Brien (screenwriter), screenwriter of Fireflies and K-9
 John Roger O'Brien (1903–1982), birth name of Jack O'Brien (jazz pianist)

See also
Jack O'Brien (disambiguation)
Sean O'Brien (disambiguation)